Michael J. O'Brien (born March 2, 1968) is an American politician and former member of the Seattle City Council who represented District 6 in northwest Seattle.  He was first elected in 2009 to a different, city-wide council seat.  He was the leading proponent of the opt-out list for the Yellow Pages. He was the only opponent of the proposed deep bore tunnel under downtown Seattle on the city council. He was chair of the local chapter of the Sierra Club before running for office. In this capacity, he was one of the leading opponents of the 2007 Roads and Transit ballot measure.

Early life and career

Mike O'Brien was born in Seattle and raised in the Eastside suburb of Clyde Hill. He holds a bachelor's degree in economics from Duke University and a M.B.A. in finance from the University of Washington, where he also earned a certificate in environmental management. O'Brien joined Seattle-based corporate law firm Stokes Lawrence as chief financial officer in 1998, where he met lawyer and neighborhood activist Mike McGinn, who would become O'Brien's friend and mentor.

Political activism

O'Brien was invited by McGinn to the Seattle chapter of the Sierra Club as a volunteer treasurer, despite his previous lack of interest in politics. O'Brien became politically involved with the group and was elected as political chair of the Seattle chapter and chair of the Washington state chapter. During the 2007 election, O'Brien served as the group's spokesperson in the debate over the Roads and Transit proposition, which would have bundled Sound Transit projects with road expansion and was opposed by the Sierra Club. The ballot measure was defeated and a transit-only version, Sound Transit 2, was proposed for the following year with the support of the Sierra Club. Mike O'Brien was a representative of the Sierra Club on the Alaskan Way Viaduct Replacement Project Stakeholder Advisory Committee in 2008.  During the 2008 campaign, O'Brien left Stokes Lawrence to be a full-time volunteer for the Sierra Club and was encouraged to run for office by McGinn and others in the environmental community.
O'Brien is currently on the Board of Directors and is the treasurer of the Sierra Club.

Political career

2009 election

In February 2009, O'Brien announced his candidacy for a city council seat that incumbent councilmember Richard McIver planned to not run for. During the August primary for Position 8, O'Brien advanced with 35 percent of votes and was set to run against second-place finisher Robert Rosencrantz. O'Brien won the general election with 58 percent of votes and was sworn-in on January 1, 2010, alongside newly-elected mayor Mike McGinn.

2015 election
O'Brien ran for the newly created District 6 position for the Seattle City Council, primarily covering Ballard, Fremont and Green Lake. He won the primary and defeated Catherine Weatbrook in the November general election.

During his term as the District 6 councilmember, O'Brien attracted criticism for his positions on transportation, housing, homelessness, policing, and taxes.

At an after-party event following a gala for the Nordic Museum on May 5, 2018, O'Brien was reportedly asked to leave and subsequently forcibly removed by members of the Pacific Fishermen Shipyard (where the event was being held). O'Brien has attracted criticism from the group for his position on the extension of the Burke-Gilman Trail in Ballard.

Facing unfavorable polling results and opposition from groups like the Metropolitan Chamber of Commerce, in February 2019 O'Brien announced he would not seek reelection to the Seattle City Council.

Electoral history

2009 election

2013 election

2015 election

References

1968 births
Living people
Seattle City Council members
21st-century American politicians
People from Clyde Hill, Washington
Duke University alumni
University of Washington alumni